Milpoš is a village and municipality in Sabinov District in the Prešov Region of north-eastern Slovakia.

History
In historical records the village was first mentioned in 1950.
Milpoš coat of arms is seen at the right.

Geography
The municipality lies at an altitude of 510 metres and covers an area of 11.081 km². It has a population of about 663 people.

External links
https://web.archive.org/web/20070513023228/http://www.statistics.sk/mosmis/eng/run.html
http://www.milpos.sk

Villages and municipalities in Sabinov District